PBA Tour Bowling 2 (also known as PBA Bowling 2) is a bowling video game from Bethesda Softworks. The game is a sequel to PBA Bowling.

Gameplay
Players can compete against other computer players as well as change the weight, color, and texture of the ball.

Development
The game was in development as early as December 1997 and was scheduled to release in 1998.

Reception

Scott Steinberg from IGN gave the game a score of 4.5 out of 10 stating "For the "sequel to the best-selling bowling game of all time," PBA Bowling 2 certainly leaves a lot to be desired. It covers all of the bases required for classification as a bowling simulation, but fails to go above and beyond the call of duty in any regard"

References 

2000 video games
Bethesda Softworks games
Bowling video games
Professional Bowlers Association
Video games developed in the United States
Windows games
Windows-only games